Moisés Quezada Mota (born December 3, 1956) is bishop coadjutor of the Episcopal Diocese of the Dominican Republic. He was elected on July 25, 2015 and consecrated on February 13, 2016. He was ordained to the diaconate on August 15, 1982, and to the priesthood on May 22, 1983.

References 

Living people
1956 births
Episcopal bishops of the Dominican Republic